The 124th Regiment of Foot was an infantry regiment of the British Army, formed in 1762 and disbanded in 1763. Its colonel was Robert Cuninghame, 1st Baron Rossmore.

References

External links

Infantry regiments of the British Army
Military units and formations established in 1762
Military units and formations disestablished in 1763